The 4th Mechanized Corps was a formation in the Soviet Red Army during the Second World War.

Operation Barbarossa
Initially formed in January 1941, it was serving with the 6th Army, Kiev Special Military District under the command of General Major Andrey Vlasov when the German Operation Barbarossa began in June 1941. On 22 June 1941 4th Mechanised Corps consisted of 28,098 Soldiers and 979 tanks. It initially comprised the 8th and 32nd Tank Divisions, the 81st Mechanised Division, the 3rd Motorcycle Regiment, and other smaller units. It fought in the Battle of Brody, and was destroyed in the Uman Pocket in August 1941 with 6th Army and was disbanded shortly after.

The second formation in 1942
The Corps was reformed for the second time in September 1942. It was commanded by General Vasily Volsky during the Battle of Stalingrad in 1942.  The corps entered the sector south of Stalingrad as part of Operation Uranus. The plan was to attack through the 51st Army's sector to obtain an encirclement by cutting through the Romanian Fourth Army led by Constantin Constantinescu.

On 20 November 1942, the Corps started feeding its initial units into the attack, between Lake Tsatsa and Barmatsak when the 126th and 302nd Rifle Divisions of 51st Army began to advance on a three-mile front supported by the 55th and 158th Independent Tank Regiments from 4th Mech Corps. The advance was made against the Romanian 6th Corps, whose units, Erickson says, began to surrender as the tanks got in among their positions.

The Corps's main attack opened late, further down the line, with three mechanised brigades hugging one road instead of the planned three, and the left-flank brigades, 36th and 59th, running into minefields. However the attack went on, until a pause at Zety on the evening on 21 November for fuel and ammunition. On the morning of 23 November, 4 Mechanised Corps linked up with 4th and 26th Tank Corps in the Sovietskii-Marinovka area and the northern and southern pincers had met. The German Sixth Army was surrounded in Stalingrad.

In December 1942 the Corps gained a Guards title and became the 3rd Guards Mechanised Corps. It fought at the Battle of Kursk as part of Steppe Front. In June 1944, for Operation Bagration, it was assigned to Chernyakhovsky's 3rd Belorussian Front as part of a Cavalry Mechanized Group which also included 3rd Cavalry Corps and was tasked to hit Bogushevsk in conjunction with 5th Army and 39th Army. Its units included 64th Guards Heavy Tank Regiment, which operated IS-2 heavy tanks while fighting as part of the 1st Baltic Front in the Šiauliai ('Shaulay') area during July 1944. It was then moved to the Far East and took part in the invasion of Manchuria as part of the Transbaikal Front.

Post War 
The Corps, which gained the honorific Stalingrad-Krivorozhskaya, became 3rd Guards Mechanised Division in November 1945, and later 47th Guards Motor Rifle Division in 1957. It was finally disbanded on 27 November 1959 while serving with 5th Army in the Far East Military District at Dalnerechensk.

Commanders 
 Major General of Tank Troops Mikhail Ivanovich Potapov (04.06.1940 – 17.01.1941),
 Major General Andrey Andreevich Vlasov (17.01.1941 – 07.1941),
 Major General of Tank Troops Georgy Rodin (18.09.1942 – 24.10.1942)
 Major-General of Tank Troops Vasily Volsky (24.10.1942 – 03.01.1943)
 Major General Alexey Pavlovich Sharagin (03.01.1943 – 03.05.1943), seriously wounded in May 1943, died of wounds 22.12.1943,
 Major General of Tank Troops, later Lieutenant General of Tank Troops Viktor Obukhov (04.05.1943 – end of the war)

See also
 Romanian Armies in the Battle of Stalingrad

Footnotes
On 7 July 1941 Colonel General Kirponos South West Front Commander reported to Stavka that the 4th Mechanised Corps consisted of 126 Tanks & on 15 July 1941 68 Tanks (6 KV-1s, 39 T-34s, 23 BT-7s).

Notes

References 
 David Glantz (1998), 'Stumbling Colossus – The Red Army on the Eve of World War', Kansas. 
 Antony Beevor (1999). Stalingrad: The Faithful Siege, Penguin.  .
 Keith E. Bonn, Slaughterhouse: Handbook of the Eastern Front, Aberjona Press, Bedford, PA, 2005
 John Erickson (historian), Road to Stalingrad, Cassel (2003), p. 430 pp
 
 

04
Military units and formations established in 1941
Military units and formations disestablished in 1959